The British Swimming Championships - 100 metres backstroke winners formerly the (Amateur Swimming Association (ASA) National Championships) are listed below. The event was originally contested over 110 yards and then switched to the metric conversion of 100 metres in 1971.

In 1960 Natalie Steward set a world record of in the final. In 1962 final Linda Ludgrove also set a new world record of 1.10.9 sec. In 1996 there was dead-heat in the women's final.

Kathy Read (married name Osher) has won a record number of senior National titles (29), which includes ten 100 metres backstroke titles.

100 metres backstroke champions

See also
British Swimming
List of British Swimming Championships champions

References

Swimming in the United Kingdom